The seventh season of Mira quién baila, also known as Mira quién baila All Stars, premiered on Univision on January 6, 2019 and ended on February 10, 2019. Javier Poza and Chiquinquirá Delgado returned as the show's hosts. Dayanara Torres returned as judge. Casper Smart and Yuri replaced Joaquín Cortés and Lola Cortés as judges. The season features two past contestants from season 4: Pedro Moreno and El Dasa. The winner, Clarissa Molina, received $25,000 for her chosen charity.

Celebrities

Ratings

References

2019 American television seasons